1992 Verdy Kawasaki season

Team name
Club nameYomiuri Nihon Soccer Club
NicknameYomiuri Verdy

Competitions

Domestic results

Emperor's Cup

J.League Cup

International results

Asian Club Championship

Player statistics

Transfers

In:

Out:

Yomiuri Junior is second team of Yomiuri SC (Verdy Kawasaki).

Transfers during the season

In
none

Out
none

Awards
J.League Cup Most Valuable Player: Kazuyoshi Miura

References

Other pages
 J. League official site
 Tokyo Verdy official site

Verdy Kawasaki
Tokyo Verdy seasons